Andrew P. Buckley Jr. (born February 13, 1965) is an American actor and former financial analyst best known for his role as David Wallace on the NBC comedy series The Office from 2006 to 2013.

Early life
Buckley was born in Salem, Massachusetts, the son of Barbara J. (King) and Andrew P. Buckley. He has two brothers and a sister. He attended Pine Crest School, where he graduated in 1983, and Stanford University, where he graduated in 1987 with a bachelor's degree in political science. He played golf on the Stanford Men's Golf Team. He later studied sketch comedy and improvisation at the Groundlings Theatre, working with comedians Melissa McCarthy and Dax Shepard.

Acting career

Early work
Buckley appeared in two 1997 music videos, "I'd Rather Ride Around with You" and "What if it's You", by country music artist Reba McEntire.

The Office
Buckley played David Wallace, embattled CFO and later CEO of the fictional Dunder Mifflin Paper Company, in 37 episodes of The Office from 2006 to 2013. At the time of his initial appearance, he had been working as a financial advisor at Merrill Lynch, and had been cast specifically because of his familiarity with the world of corporate finance. He continued to work in the finance industry full-time during his recurring role on The Office.

Other work
In addition to The Office, Buckley has appeared in television series such as The League, CSI: Miami, NYPD Blue, The West Wing, and Veep. In 2010, his bit in the film The Other Guys climaxed with a fall from an eighth-floor ledge. That year, he had another supporting role in the film Life as We Know It with Katherine Heigl and Josh Duhamel.

As of 2011, Buckley was cast as Captain Correlli in the children's film Alvin and the Chipmunks: Chipwrecked. He played Rose Byrne's husband in the 2011 hit movie Bridesmaids, though his part was mostly cut out. He was cast as Ted Mercer, a happily married adoptive parent and plastic surgeon, in ABC Family's The Lying Game. In 2015, he appeared in a supporting role in the science fiction adventure film Jurassic World. In 2017, Buckley joined the cast of writer/director Chris Blake's indie horror film, All Light Will End, alongside Sarah Butler, John Schuck, and Sam Jones III.

In 2018 Buckley appeared with golfer Phil Mickelson in a commercial for Workday, Inc with Mickelson acting as his "Business Caddy" for important business decisions.

In 2020, Variety announced Buckley was joining the cast of the Chris Blake quarantine comedy, Distancing Socially. It would mark Buckley's second on-screen collaboration with the director. The film was shot at the height of the Covid-19 pandemic in 2020, using remote technologies and the iPhone 11. The film was acquired and released by Cinedigm in October of 2021.

Filmography

Film

Television

Web

References

External links

The Star Scoop interview
Conversations with Ross - Episode 12: Featuring Andy Buckley
Andy Buckley archive at OfficeTally.com

Living people
Male actors from Los Angeles
1965 births
Stanford University alumni
20th-century American male actors
21st-century American male actors
Male actors from Massachusetts
American male film actors
American male television actors
Pine Crest School alumni